Athos may refer to:

Fictional or mythical characters
 Athos (character), one of the title characters in the novel The Three Musketeers (1844)  by Alexandre Dumas père
 Athos (mythology), one of the Gigantes in Greek mythology
 Athos Fadigati, the protagonist of the novel The Gold-Rimmed Spectacles (1954) by Giorgio Bassani and of its film adaptation The Gold Rimmed Glasses (1987) 
 Athos Magnani, father and son protagonists of Bertolucci's film The Spider's Stratagem (1970)
 Athos Roussos, in the novel Fugitive Pieces (1996) by Anne Michaels
 Athos, in the video game Fire Emblem (2003)

People
 Armand d'Athos (1615–1643), Gascon black musketeer of the Maison du Roi in 17th century France
 Athos Bulcão (1918–2008), Brazilian painter and sculptor
 Athos Careghi (born 1939), Italian cartoonist
 Athos Chrysostomou (born 1981), Cypriot football goalkeeper
 Athos de Oliveira (born 1943), Brazilian swimmer
 Athos Dimoulas (1921–1985), Greek poet
 Athos Fava (1925–2016), Argentine communist
 Athos Schwantes (born 1985), Brazilian fencer
 Athos Solomou (born 1985), Cypriot footballer
 Athos Tanzini (1913–2008), Italian fencer
 Athos Valsecchi (1919–1985)

Places
 Mount Athos, a mountain in Greece
 Athos Range, a mountain range in Antarctica
 Athos, a village in France, part of the commune Athos-Aspis

Ships
 SS Athos, a 1915 French cargo-passenger ship sunk by a U-boat in World War I
 Athos 1, a tanker from which spilled crude oil into the Delaware River in 2004

Arts and entertainment
 Athos, a fictional planet in the 1986 science fiction novel Ethan of Athos by Lois McMaster Bujold
 Athos (Stargate), a fictional planet in the TV series Stargate Atlantis
 Athos (album), a 1994 album by Stephan Micus

See also
 Atos (disambiguation)
 Anthos (disambiguation)